Linganore is a census-designated place (CDP) in Frederick County, in the U.S. state of Maryland. It consists of the area around Lake Linganore, a residential community governed by a homeowners association, located east of the city of Frederick. As of the 2020 census the CDP had a population of 12,351. Prior to 2010, the area was part of the Linganore-Bartonsville CDP. The mailing address for the area is Lake Linganore, with a ZIP code of 21774.

Geography
The community is in eastern Frederick County, on both sides of Linganore Creek, a west-flowing tributary of the Monocacy River and part of the Potomac River watershed. The neighborhoods of the community surround Lake Linganore, an impoundment on the creek, and extend south to Interstate 70, between New Market to the east and Bartonsville and Spring Ridge to the west.

Demographics

References

External links

Lake Linganore Association at Eaglehead, homeowners' association

Census-designated places in Frederick County, Maryland
Census-designated places in Maryland